Lahor is a tehsil located in Swabi, Khyber Pakhtunkhwa, Pakistan. The town of Lahor is the headquarters of the tehsil.

Administration
Lahor Tehsil is administratively subdivided into 17 Union Councils. The tehsil boundaries touch the districts of Nowshera, Attock and Swabi Tehsil. The village of Lahor itself has two Union Councils, Lahor Gharbi and Lahor Shirqi (East and West).
Gobamba

References

Tehsils of Khyber Pakhtunkhwa
Populated places in Swabi District